Artur Andreyevich Ryabokobylenko (born 5 April 1991) is a Russian professional football player. He plays for FC Sokol Saratov.

Club career
He made his Russian Premier League debut for FC Amkar Perm on 14 April 2012 in a game against FC Krylia Sovetov Samara.

External links

References

1991 births
People from Nizhny Novgorod Oblast
Sportspeople from Nizhny Novgorod Oblast
Russian people of Ukrainian descent
Living people
Russian footballers
Association football midfielders
FC Amkar Perm players
FC Sokol Saratov players
PFC Spartak Nalchik players
FC Baltika Kaliningrad players
FC Tyumen players
FC Tosno players
FC Fakel Voronezh players
FC Zvezda Perm players
Russian Premier League players
Russian First League players
Russian Second League players